Meri Saasu Maa is a 2016 family television drama that aired on Indian television channel Zee TV. Hiba Nawab played a lead role in the series. it replaces Qubool Hai in its timeslot. it was replaced by Sanyukt.

The series follows lead character Pari Sinha, who grew up without motherly love and seeks to establish a loving relationship with in her mother-in-law. As a newlywed, Pari finds it difficult to adjust to living with her in-laws.

Plot

The story opens at the Shinha household with preparations for Pari's wedding. Her miserly aunt, who raised her without affection, refuses to spend money on it and Pari is doing much of the work, including restarting the house's generator. The baraat (groom's wedding procession) arrives, and Pari is reprimanded by her aunt for not being ready. As Pari goes to dress, she spies upon the baraat and sees the groom's mother – and imagines receiving the motherly love she always wanted. However, Pari overhears the groom and his mother talking to his lover in the rickshaw, saying that the marriage is a sham. The aunt rushes a horrified Pari to the ceremony, where Pari confronts them with what she witnessed; they deny it and leave, feigning insult, and Pari is blamed.

The next day at the Sharma household, celebrity and family matriarch Bhawna Devi chases down her granddaughter Suman for wearing Western clothes and riding on a motorcycle with a boy. She reprimands the women of the house for the way Suman was raised, which taints her reputation, and threatens Suman and her mother – who thinks Devi can only be calmed by her favourite son Sattu. Sattu is then shown devotedly praying in a temple, asking blessings for his mother. As he descends the temple stairs, he bumps into Pari. The diyas (oil lamps) set fire to her dupatta (scarf) and then all the hangings around them. Sattu jumps into the fire surrounding a frightened Pari.

Arc two
Sattu dies in a car accident. The plot makes a six-year leap and sees Pari and Maasaab in a house with Bunty Singh Chauhan, whom she later marries, and Bhavna living happily.

Cast

Main
 Hiba Nawab as Pari Sharma /Singh (Nee' Sinha)– Emotionally neglected as a child, she later marries Devi. 
 Anindita Saha Kapileshwari as (Maa Saab) Bhawna Devi/ Rachna Devi – Sattu's mother, Pari's mother-in-law (Hindi: Saasu Maa)
 Pearl V Puri as Satyendra "Sattu" Sharma – He marries Pari and later dies
 Siddharth Arora as Bunty Singh Chauhan
 Nimai Bali as Digvijay Singh Chauhan
 Mazel Vyas as Arpita Chauhan – Bunty's younger sister
 Suman Shashi Kant as Sashikala Sinha – Pari's miserly aunt (Hindi: maasi), who considers Pari to be a burden and raised her without affection
 Meenakshi Arya 
 Prithvi Shankala as Pari's father
 Krishna Soni as Kamlesh Sharma
 Dhiraj Totlani as Ankit Sinha – Pari's brother
 Arpita Amar as Meera Sinha – Pari's sister
 Rashul Tandon as Sarvesh Sharma
 Nirmala J Chandra as Aarti Sarvesh Sharma
 Kushabh Manghani as Akhilesh Sharma
 Tanvi Dogra as Babita Akhilesh Sharma
 Haider Karim as Mastana
 Aanchal Khurana as Roopmati
 Nina Sharma / Kiran Bhargava as Daddo (the eldest woman in the house) (dead)
 Tisha Kapoor as Shona

Notable guest appearances
Rakhi Sawant
Shamita Shetty appears in a one-hour episode with Kaala Teeka

References

External links
 Official website

Zee TV original programming
Indian drama television series